is the fifth single by Japanese singer Yuki Saito.

Background and release
"Kanashimi yo Konnichi wa" was used as the first opening theme of the anime TV series Maison Ikkoku. It was used in a total of 36 episodes (through episode 37, with the exception of episode 24 which had a different theme song). The song was also used as an image song for a line of Shiseido hair care products.

The B-side release was "Ohikkoshi, Wasuremono", which was written by Saito and Toshio Kamei.

"Kanashimi yo Konnichi wa" peaked at No. 3 on Oricon's weekly singles chart.  Additionally, it reached No. 19 in Oricon's overall sales for singles in 1986.

The original single sold 289,000 copies. It was later re-released as a mini CD single on April 29, 1988, and re-released as part of a 21st Century ver. on November 28, 2007.

Track listing
All music is arranged by Satoshi Takebe.

Chart history

21st Century ver.

Kanashimi yo Konnichi wa (21st Century ver.) is a rearranged single by Yuki Saito, released on November 28, 2007, through Team Entertainment. It features songs first released between 1985 and 1989 with the vocals and music remastered, rerecorded, and rearranged.

"Kazoku no Shokutaku" included here is from the 1987 album Fūmu, which reached #1 on the Oricon charts. While "21st Century ver." series album covers generally feature anime cover art, this release features a photo of Saito.

Track listing
All music is arranged by Taisuke Sawachika.

Cover versions
Several artists have released cover versions of "Kanashimi yo Konnichi wa". In 2004, Sana covered the song in the musical arcade game Pop'n Music 11. J-pop artist Ayano Tsuji released a cover on the Words of Yukinojō tribute album, featuring songs with lyrics written by Yukinojō Mori. The album reached #47 on the Oricon charts and remained on the lists for four weeks.

On her 2006 compilation album Remember, pop singer and songwriter Mikuni Shimokawa released a cover version, reaching #66 on the Oricon charts and remaining charted for two weeks. Eriko Nakamura, as her character Haruka Amami from The Idolmaster game, sang a cover version on the album The Idolmaster Master Artist 01: Amami Haruka. The album reached #21 on the Oricon charts and remained on the list for 3 weeks.

Romi released a cover on her 2008 album Ano Uta. Two covers were released in 2009: Rie Tanaka (as her character Maria in the anime series Hayate the Combat Butler) sang a cover version on the Hayate the Combat Butler Character Cover CD, and race queen and singer Mao Makabe released a cover on the omnibus multi-artist album Ai Love J-Euro from Farm Records.

In 2010, three covers were released. From the anime series White Album, the character Yuki Morikawa (voiced by Aya Hirano) covered "Kanashimi yo Konnichi wa" on the character CD single Koiiro Sora. Sumi Shimamoto, the voice of Kyoko Otonashi from Maison Ikkoku, released a cover on her album Shimamoto Sumi Sings Her Legends. Singer and actor Yūzō Imai also released a cover on his album Kimi to Aruita Jikan.

On his album Offer Music Box, Kōji Tamaki—who composed the original song—covered the song in 2012.

Hiroko Moriguchi will cover the song on her 2023 cover album Anison Covers.

Notes

References

1986 singles
1986 songs
2007 singles
Yuki Saito (actress) songs
Japanese-language songs
Anime songs
Maison Ikkoku
Pony Canyon singles
Songs written by Yukinojo Mori